Cistanche tubulosa is a desert holoparasitic plant species in the genus Cistanche. It lacks chlorophyll and obtains nutrients and water from the host plants whose roots it parasitizes.

Uses
The plant is grown in the Taklamakan Desert, and is traditionally used for medicines and foods in China.

The main sources of the Chinese herbal medicine cistanche (Chinese: 肉苁蓉, pinyin ròucongróng) are Cistanche salsa and Cistanche deserticola, although it may also be obtained from C. tubulosa. The drug, known in Chinese as suosuo dayun, is collected in spring before sprouting, by slicing the stems of the plant.

References

External links
 
 

Plants used in traditional Chinese medicine
Orobanchaceae
Parasitic plants
Plants described in 1850